Robert Emmanuel Collin (24 October 1928 – 29 November 2010) was a Canadian American electrical engineer, university professor and life fellow of the IEEE. Collin was elected to the National Academy of Engineering in 1990.

Biography
Collin was born on 24 October 1928 in the small town of Donalda, Alberta, Canada. He received an undergraduate degree from the University of Saskatchewan and a PhD in electrical engineering from University of London (Imperial College). He worked at the Canadian Armament and Research Development Establishment on guided missile antennas, radomes and radar system evaluations.

Collin taught at Case Western Reserve University between 1958 and 1997. His served stints as the electrical engineering department chair and the interim dean of engineering. He was a distinguished visiting professor at Ohio State University and was a visiting professor at universities in Brazil, China and Germany.

He made significant contributions to the field of microwaves. He is widely known for his textbooks on electromagnetic waves, microwave engineering and antennas. He was a life fellow of the IEEE.  Among his students, Collin was viewed as remarkable for his ability to recount the uttermost details of lengthy mathematical proofs from memory. He was an outstanding scholar of microwave and radar engineering and relativistic electrodynamics based on tensor calculus.  During the Korean War era, Dr. Collin achieved many important engineering breakthroughs for His Majesty's and Her Majesty's governments.

Books
Collin RE, Antennas and Radiowave Propagation, McGraw-Hill, 1985.
Collin RE, Field Theory of Guided Waves, 2nd ed, IEEE, 1991.
Collin RE, Foundations for Microwave Engineering, 2nd ed, IEEE, 2001.
Collin RE; Zucker FJ; eds, Antenna Theory, 2 vols, McGraw-Hill, 1969.
Hansen RC; Collin RE, Small Antenna Handbook, Wiley, 2011.
Plonsey R; Collin RE, Principles and Applications of Electromagnetic Fields, McGraw-Hill, 1961.

Awards
1990: Member, National Academy of Engineering
1992: IEEE APS Distinguished Career Award; IEEE Schelkunoff Prize Paper Award
1999: IEEE Electromagnetics Award
2000: IEEE Third Millennium Medal

References

1928 births
2010 deaths
Alumni of Imperial College London
University of Saskatchewan alumni
Case Western Reserve University faculty
Canadian electrical engineers
Fellow Members of the IEEE
Engineering writers
Canadian academics in engineering
Microwave engineers
Electrical engineering academics
Members of the United States National Academy of Engineering
Canadian emigrants to the United States
American electrical engineers